Submarine Alert is a 1943 American film directed by Frank McDonald, produced by Pine-Thomas Productions and released by Paramount Pictures. The film stars Richard Arlen, Wendy Barrie, Nils Asther, Roger Pryor, Marc Lawrence and Ralph Sanford.

Plot
During World War II, with shipping being sunk by submarines and with an American scientist working on radio technology killed by Nazi spies, FBI agent G. B. Fleming (Roger Pryor) comes up with a plan to catch the Nazis. He believes that radio signals are alerting the Germans about ship movements. His plan is to fire all the local radio specialists, who likely will seek any employment, including working with the enemy. Tailing the jobless radio men will help the FBI find the Nazis.

Engineer Lewis J. "Lew" Deerhold (Richard Arlen) thinks he lost his job because he is a Canadian citizen. Lew looks after his niece Tina (Patsy Nash), a war orphan requiring a brain operation. Needing money, he applies for work at a radio repair shop, where he meets Ann Patterson (Wendy Barrie), the victim of a purse snatching. Lew recovers her purse and asks Ann out on a date.

After coming back to his apartment, his new boss is there with Dr. Arthur Huneker (Nils Asther) and his assistant Vincent Bela (Marc Lawrence).  Lew is offered a job by Huneker, a Nazi spy commander who needs someone to repair a top-secret stolen radio transmitter. Ann is an FBI agent who has been assigned to follow Lew. She finds blueprints to the transmitter in Lew's possession. When FBI agent Freddie Grayson (Ralph Sanford) searches Lew's apartment, he is shot but is able to tell Lew that the doctor has the stolen transmitter and shot him.

Lew confronts Huneker, who is meeting with Japanese Commander Toyo (Abner Biberman). The pair try to convince Lew to join the Nazi party; he pretends to go along. When they begin to torture the owner of the Bambridge shipping company (John Miljan), their new recruit is ordered to kill Bambridge, who is actually Captain Hargas, an American agent. Instead, Lew escapes, taking with him the codes for the transmitter.

At the doctor's hot springs resort, Lew and Ann join forces, but are captured and locked in a steam room by Huneker. Before they are killed by the steam, Lew devises a transmitter and sends an SOS that is picked up by a young boy whose father calls the FBI. FBI agents rush to save Lew and Ann, and arrest Huneker and his men. Agent Fleming also contacts a bomber squadron that destroys the Japanese submarine laying in wait off the California coast. With his niece Tina recovered from her operation, and Ann in attendance, Lew, now a private in the US Army, is granted American citizenship.

Cast
 Richard Arlen as Lewis J. "Lew" Deerhold
 Wendy Barrie as FBI Agent Ann Patterson
 Nils Asther as Dr. Arthur Huneker
 Roger Pryor as G.B. Fleming
 Abner Biberman as Commander Toyo
 Marc Lawrence as Vincent Bela
 John Miljan as Mr. Bambridge / Capt. Haigas
 Patsy Nash as Tina Deerhold
 Ralph Sanford as FBI Agent Freddie Grayson

Production

Principal photography for Submarine Alert took place from June 1 to mid-June 1942 at the Fine Arts Studios, Hollywood, California.

Reception
Submarine Alert was another in the series of B films churned out by the Pine-Thomas team. The film villain again was Swedish-born Nils Asther who was featured in three war adventures put out by William H. Pine and William C. Thomas.

Like many of the spy and secret agent films of the era, it was a cautionary tale about the dangers of Nazi and Axis infiltration. As a mildly patriotic vehicle, the film also made a statement about American values.  For reviewer Hal Erickson, "The plot of the Pine-Thomas adventure quickie 'Submarine Alert' is more than a little beholden to Hitchcock's 'The 39 Steps'."

The film was not released for a year after it was made. Variety thought this made the film out of date.

References

Notes

Citations

Bibliography

 Hyams, Jay. War Movies. New York: W.H. Smith Publishers, Inc., 1984. .
 Koppes, Clayton R. and Gregory D. Black. Hollywood Goes to War: How Politics, Profits and Propaganda Shaped World War II Movies. New York, The Free Press, 1987. .

External links

 
 
 
Review of film at Variety
 

1943 films
American spy films
American black-and-white films
1940s English-language films
Films directed by Frank McDonald
Films scored by Freddie Rich
Paramount Pictures films
World War II films made in wartime
World War II spy films
1940s spy films
American war films
1940s war films